Eugenia tekuensis is a species of plant in the family Myrtaceae. It is a tree endemic to Peninsular Malaysia, where it is known only from Pahang.

References

tekuensis
Endemic flora of Peninsular Malaysia
Trees of Peninsular Malaysia
Conservation dependent plants
Taxonomy articles created by Polbot